The life-years lost or years of lost life (YLL) is a unit to measure the number of expected years of human life lost following an unexpected event, such as death by illness, crime or war.

Life-years lost is a flexible measure which have been used to measure the effects of overall mortality of non-communicable diseases, drug misuse and suicide, epidemics (example COVID-19 pandemic), wars, and natural disasters such as earthquakes. Life-years lost are based on both the number of deaths and the age of those who died. It estimates the number of years that those who died would have lived if they did not met their accidental a deadly fate. Higher YLLs can be due to larger numbers of death, few sharply younger deaths or some combination of the two.

See also 
 Quality-adjusted life year
 Years of potential life lost

References 

Epidemiology
Health economics
Life expectancy